Taurocimmerites dublanskii is a species of beetle in the family Carabidae, the only species in the genus Taurocimmerites.

References

Trechinae